The Beltrami identity, named after Eugenio Beltrami, is a special case of the Euler–Lagrange equation in the calculus of variations.

The Euler–Lagrange equation serves to extremize action functionals of the form

If , then the Euler–Lagrange equation reduces to the Beltrami identity,

where  is a constant.

Derivation

Because , we write

By the product rule, the right side is equivalent to

By integrating both sides and putting both terms on one side, we get the Beltrami identity,

Applications

Solution to the brachistochrone problem 

An example of an application of the Beltrami identity is the brachistochrone problem, which involves finding the curve  that minimizes the integral

The integrand 

does not depend explicitly on the variable of integration , so the Beltrami identity applies,
 

which can be solved with the result put in the form of parametric equations 

with  being half the above constant, and  being a variable. These are the parametric equations for a cycloid.

Notes

References

Calculus of variations
Optimal control